Alevtina Shastitko (born 22 April 1939) is a Soviet athlete. She competed in the women's javelin throw at the 1960 Summer Olympics.

References

External links
 

1939 births
Living people
Athletes (track and field) at the 1960 Summer Olympics
Soviet female javelin throwers
Olympic athletes of the Soviet Union
Athletes from Saint Petersburg